Dobriška Vas is a small village south of Oplotnica in eastern Slovenia. The area is part of the traditional region of Styria. The Municipality of Oplotnica is now included in the Drava Statistical Region.

A small Neo-Gothic roadside chapel in the western part of the settlement dates to the first quarter of the 20th century.

References

External links
Dobriška Vas on Geopedia

Populated places in the Municipality of Oplotnica